Slava Mogutin (full name Yaroslav Yurievich Mogutin, b. April 12, 1974, Kemerovo) is a New York-based Russian artist and author, who works across different media, including photography, video, text, installation, sculpture, and painting.

Life in Russia 
Born in Siberia, in the industrial city of Kemerovo, Mogutin moved to Moscow as a teenager to separate himself from the elders. He soon began working as a journalist for the first independent Russian publishers, newspapers and radio stations.

At the age of 21, Mogutin had gained both critical acclaim and official condemnation for his outspoken queer writings and activism. Accused of "open and deliberate contempt for generally accepted moral norms"; "malicious hooliganism with exceptional cynicism and extreme insolence"; "inflaming social, national, and religious division"; "propaganda of brutal violence, psychic pathology, and sexual perversions" – he came under harassment and a continuous criminal investigation. The situation escalated further when Mogutin attempted to register for the first same-sex marriage in Russian history with his partner at the time Robert Filippini. This led him to become the target of two highly publicized criminal cases, carrying a potential prison sentence of up to 7 years. The criminal cases were initiated after his publications in Novy Vzglyad – scandalous political independent newspaper headed at the time by Yevgeny Dodolev. In Novy Vzglyad, Mogutin met Eduard Limonov, who eventually became his spiritual mentor. Confined to about three years of house arrest and increasing tension with the lingering criminal cases, Mogutin fled.

Exile in New York
Forced to leave Russia, Mogutin was granted political asylum in the US with the support of Amnesty International and PEN American Center. This asylum to the US became the first to be granted based on homophobic prosecution. Upon his arrival in New York City, he shifted his focus to visual art and became an active member of the downtown art scene. Since 1999, his photography has been exhibited internationally and featured in a wide range of publications including The New York Times, The Village Voice, i-D, Visionaire, L'Uomo Vogue, Secret Behavior, and BUTT.

Mogutin is the author of several hardcover monographs of photography, including Lost Boys and NYC Go-Go. Additionally, he has written seven books in Russian. Inspiration for the images in Lost Boys is said to have come from his return to Russia when Vladimir Putin took office in 2000 and charges against Mogutin were lifted.

Mogutin is the winner of the Andrei Belyi Prize for Literature (2000). His poetry, fiction, essays, and interviews have appeared in numerous publications and anthologies in 6 languages. He has translated into Russian Allen Ginsberg's poetry, William S. Burroughs' essays and Dennis Cooper's fiction. He appeared as an actor in Bruce LaBruce's agitprop porn movie Skin Flick (1999) and Laura Colella's independent feature Stay Until Tomorrow (2004).

On July 14, 2017, Mogutin published his newest monograph, Bros and Brosephines. The book features collection of photographs taken during the last two decades.

After becoming a US citizen in 2011, Mogutin officially changed his name to Slava. Mogutin continues to work on his multimedia art and has publicly criticized the president of Russia, Vladimir Putin for his homophobic political policies.
     
In 2004, together with his partner-collaborator Brian Kenny, he co-founded SUPERM, a multimedia art team responsible for site-specific gallery and museum shows in New York City, Los Angeles, Moscow, Berlin, London, Oslo, Bergen, Haifa, and León, Spain.

Contemporary Exhibitions
On August 2, 2013, Mogutin debuted "In The Name of Love", at iMOCA in Indianapolis. It was curated by the Madrid-born culture writer and editor, Karla D. Romero. It was a collaborative exhibition of individual pieces by Mogutin and others from SUPERM.
On November 21, 2014, Mogutin and Kenny opened "AMORESUPERM" at LaFresh Gallery in Madrid, run by Argentine-born LGBT icon, .

Works

Mogutin, Slava (2017). Bros & Brosephines. Getsy, David, Wandrag, January 1976 Brooklyn, NY: Powerhouse. .

References

External links

Slava Mogutin's blog

Slava Mogutin's unofficial site (in Russian)
Environmental Pictures in Visura Magazine
Artist profile in Fotograf Magazine

Interviews
3:AM magazine
The Stranger
Index magazine
kidsofdada.com

Russian contemporary artists
Russian gay artists
Russian gay writers
People from Kemerovo
Writers from Moscow
Writers from New York City
1974 births
Living people
English–Russian translators
20th-century Russian translators
20th-century Russian male writers